RHN could mean:
 Red Hat Network, a software update service for Red Hat Linux
 Northern Rhodesia, an historical territory in south central Africa
 Royal Hospital for Neuro-disability